Fulgurites, commonly known as "fossilized lightning", are natural tubes, clumps, or masses of sintered, vitrified, and/or fused soil, sand, rock, organic debris and other sediments that sometimes form when lightning discharges into ground. When composed of silica, fulgurites are classified as a variety of the mineraloid lechatelierite.

When ordinary negative polarity cloud-ground lightning discharges into a grounding substrate, greater than 100 million volts (100 MV) of potential difference may be bridged. Such current may propagate into silica-rich quartzose sand, mixed soil, clay, or other sediments, rapidly vaporizing and melting resistant materials within such a common dissipation regime. This results in the formation of generally hollow and/or vesicular, branching assemblages of glassy tubes, crusts, and clumped masses. Fulgurites have no fixed composition because their chemical composition is determined by the physical and chemical properties of whatever material is being struck by lightning.

Fulgurites are structurally similar to Lichtenberg figures, which are the branching patterns produced on surfaces of insulators during dielectric breakdown by high-voltage discharges, such as lightning.

Description
Fulgurites are formed when lightning strikes the ground, fusing and vitrifying mineral grains. The primary SiO2 phase in common tube fulgurites is lechatelierite, an amorphous silica glass. Many fulgurites show some evidence of crystallization: in addition to glasses, many are partially protocrystalline or microcrystalline. Because fulgurites are generally amorphous in structure, fulgurites are classified as mineraloids.

Material properties (size, color, texture) of fulgurites vary widely, depending on the size of the lightning bolt and composition and moisture content of the surface struck by lightning. Most natural fulgurites fall on a spectrum from white to black. Iron is a common impurity that can result in a deep brownish-green coloration. Lechatelierite similar to fulgurites can also be produced via controlled (or uncontrolled) arcing of artificial electricity into a medium. Downed high voltage power lines have produced brightly-colored lechatelierites, due to the incorporation of copper or other materials from the power lines themselves. Brightly-colored lechatelierites resembling fulgurites are usually synthetic and reflect the incorporation of synthetic materials. However, lightning can strike man-made objects, resulting in colored fulgurites.

The interior of Type I (sand) fulgurites normally is smooth or lined with fine bubbles, while their exteriors are coated with rough sedimentary particles or small rocks. Other types of fulgurites are usually vesicular, and may lack an open central tube; their exteriors can be porous or smooth. Branching fulgurites display fractal-like self-similarity and structural scale invariance as a macroscopic or microscopic network of root-like branches, and can display this texture without central channels or obvious divergence from morphology of context or target (e.g. sheet-like melt, rock fulgurites). Fulgurites are usually fragile, making the field collection of large specimens difficult.

Or they may form directly on sedimentary surfaces. The Winans Lake fulgurite[s] (Winans Lake, Livingston County, Michigan), extended discontinuously throughout a 30 m range, and arguably includes the largest reported fulgurite mass ever recovered and described: its largest section extending approximately 16 ft (4.88 m) in length by 1 ft in diameter (30 cm).

Peak temperatures within a lightning channel exceed 30,000 K, with sufficient pressure to produce planar deformation features in SiO2, a kind of polymorphism. This is also known colloquially as shocked quartz.

Classification

Fulgurites have been classified by Pasek et al. (2012) into five types related to the type of sediment in which the fulgurite formed, as follows:

Type I - sand fulgurites with tubaceous structure; their central axial void may be collapsed
Type II - soil fulgurites; these are glass-rich, and form in a wide range of sediment compositions, including clay-rich soils, silt-rich soils, gravel-rich soils, and loessoid; these may be tubaceous, branching, vesicular, irregular/slaggy, or may display a combination of these structures, and can produce exogenic fulgurites (droplet fulgurites)
Type III - caliche or calcic sediment fulgurites, having thick, often surficially glazed granular walls with calcium-rich vitreous groundmass with little or no lechatelierite glass; their shapes are variable, with multiple narrow central channels common, and can span the entire range of morphological and structural variation for fulguritic objects
Type IV - rock fulgurites, which are either crusts on minimally altered rocks, networks of tunneling within rocks, vesicular outgassed rocks (often glazed by a silicide-rich and/or metal oxide crust), or completely vitrified and dense rock material and masses of these forms with little sedimentary groundmass
Type V - [droplet] fulgurites (exogenic fulgurites), which show evidence of ejection (e.g. spheroidal, filamentous, or aerodynamic), related by composition to Type II and Type IV fulgurites
phytofulgurite - an additional class that does not involve specific morphology, promulgated prior to the Pasek-Block 2012 scheme, has been assigned to fulgurites that result from partial to total alteration of biomass (e.g. grasses, lichens, moss, wood).

Significance

Paleoenvironmental indicator 

The presence of fulgurites in an area can be used to estimate the frequency of lightning over a period of time, which can help to understand past regional climates. Paleolightning is the study of various indicators of past lightning strikes, primarily in the form of fulgurites and lightning-induced remanent magnetization (LIRM) signatures.

Place in planetary processes and the geologic record 

Many high-pressure, high-temperature materials have been observed in fulgurites. Many of these minerals and compounds are also known to be formed in extreme environments such as nuclear weapon tests, hypervelocity impacts, and interstellar space. Shocked quartz was first described in fulgurites in 1980. Other materials, including highly reduced silicon-metal alloys (silicides), the fullerene allotropes C60 (buckminsterfullerenes) and C70, as well as high-pressure polymorphs of SiO2, have since been identified in fulgurites.

Reduced phosphides have been identified in fulgurites, in the form of schreibersite ( and ), and titanium(III) phosphide. These reduced compounds are otherwise rare on Earth due to the presence of oxygen in Earth's atmosphere, which creates oxidizing surface conditions.

Place in material culture 

In 2008, An object later classified as a fulgurite, but initially believed by archaeologists to be an igneous cinder, was found within the contents of the ritual ash altar at the temple of Lykaian Zeus at Mount Lykaion in Greece. The object was identified and studied by geologist George H. Davis (past president of the Geological Society of America). It may be contemporaneous with ancient site use, and as such potentially associated with ritual activity performed there.

See also
 Impactite
 Tektite
 Trinitite
 Electromechanical disintegration

References

External links

H. J. Melosh, Impact geologists, beware!  Geophysical Research Letters, Volume44, Issue17, Pages 8873–8874, 2017
Petrified Lightning by Peter E. Viemeister (pdf)
Interview (The Event: Petrified Lightning from Central Florida) with artist Allan McCollum along with an historical archive of sixty-six
Mindat with location data
W. M. Myers and Albert B. Peck, A Fulgurite from South Amboy, New Jersey, American Mineralogist, Volume 10, pages 152–155, 1925
Vladimir A. Rakov, Lightning Makes Glass, 29th Annual Conference of the Glass Art Society, Tampa, Florida, 1999

Metamorphic rocks
Mineralogy
Glass in nature
Paleoclimatology
Lightning
Geochemistry